AAI is a 2021 electronic music album by Mouse on Mars.

Reception 

The album received "generally favorable reviews" according to critic review aggregator Metacritic.

References

Further reading 

 
 

2021 albums
Electronic albums by German artists
Mouse on Mars albums
Thrill Jockey albums